Donald Dean Gabrielson (born 1966) is a retired United States Navy rear admiral and surface warfare officer who last served as the 10th commander of the United States Naval Forces Southern Command and United States Fourth Fleet from May 21, 2019 to September 3, 2021.

History 
He was promoted to rear admiral effective August 1, 2019.

Education 
A native of Minnesota, Gabrielson graduated from the United States Naval Academy with a Bachelor of Science degree in 1989, and earned a Master of Science degree in operations research from the Naval Postgraduate School in 1995, and a master's degree from the National War College in 2005.

Awards and decorations

References

1966 births
Living people
Place of birth missing (living people)
People from Minnesota
Military personnel from Minnesota
United States Naval Academy alumni
Naval Postgraduate School alumni
National War College alumni
Recipients of the Distinguished Service Medal (United States)
Recipients of the Legion of Merit
United States Navy rear admirals (upper half)
Recipients of the Defense Superior Service Medal